Yevgeniya Pecherina (born 9 May 1989) is a Russian track and field athlete who specialises in the discus throw.

In international competition, she took sixth place at the 2009 European Athletics U23 Championships.

However, later that month, she gave a positive drug test for the banned anabolic steroid methandienone. She received a two year ban from the sport. Immediately prior to the end of her ban, she again gave a positive drug test, this time for Dehydrochloromethyltestosterone, another steroid. This resulted in a ten-year ban from the sport.

Pecherina was interviewed for a German documentary, Top-secret Doping: How Russia makes its Winners, shown on Das Erste in December 2014. She claimed that doping was widespread in Russia, with the majority of international athletes using performance-enhancing drugs, which were made freely available to them. The Russian Anti-Doping Agency and the Russian Athletics Federation both said that her statements were baseless. However, the federation president (and IAAF treasurer) Valentin Balakhnichev was implicated in the cover up of doping by Liliya Shobukhova (a prominent marathon runner), and he stepped down from his position while the investigation was ongoing.

See also
List of doping cases in athletics

References

External links

Living people
1989 births
Russian female discus throwers
Doping cases in athletics
Russian sportspeople in doping cases